There are other meanings for Amaya.

Amaya is the name of a village (pop. 67) in the municipality of Sotresgudo, Burgos, in Castile-Leon, Spain.

The name of the village has Indo-European roots  and means "am (ma)" or "mother". The suffix io-ia is also used to form action names or toponyms, implying that the meaning of Amaya or Amaia is "mother city", as it will be called later "the capital". Other hypothesis is that the name derives from the Proto-Basque or Basque word Amaia, meaning "the end".

Amaya was one of the main villages of the Cantabri Celtic tribes, and played a key role in the Cantabrian wars during the Roman conquest of Hispania, and later, during the Visigothic Kingdom, as the capital of the Duchy of Cantabria. 
Amaya is mentioned in the Chronicle of John of Biclaro, as a town captured by the Visigothic king Liuvigild in 574.

According to the Muslim chroniclers, in the year 714, Musa ibn Nusair sacked Amaya for the second time after Tariq did the year before. Peter, the provincial dux, led his people into refuge in the mountains, and after the local noble Pelayo of Asturias in the neighbor region of Asturias started a rebellion against the Berber garrison, Dux Peter as other western Galician nobles supported the election of him as new King or Princeps in the lead against the common enemy.

In the first stages of the Reconquista, the city was part of the repopulating efforts of the Kingdom of Asturias in the border region of Bardulia, the primitive territories of Castile. After the campaigns of Alfonso I of Asturias (739-757) against the Moors, the city lay an abandoned in the largely empty buffer zone between Moors and Christians known at the time as "The Desert of the Duero" and was part of the repopulation campaign carried out a century later,  during the reign of Ordoño I of Asturias (850-866).

At that time it was an important and significant place, as a very old saying states: "Harto era Castilla pequeño rincón, cuando Amaya era la cabeza y Montes de Oca el mojón" (A very small corner was Castile, when Amaya was the head and Montes de Oca the boundary stone).

Amaya seems to have been a short-lived bishopric, which, no longer being a residential diocese, is today listed by the Catholic Church as a titular see.

References 

Archaeological sites in Castile and León
Populated places in the Province of Burgos
Towns in Spain